Albert Edward Oatway (29 September 1913 – 20 February 1971) was an Australian rules footballer who played for the St Kilda Football Club in the Victorian Football League (VFL).

Notes

External links 

1913 births
1971 deaths
Australian rules footballers from South Australia
St Kilda Football Club players
Port Adelaide Football Club (SANFL) players
Port Adelaide Football Club players (all competitions)